This is a list of all tornadoes that were confirmed by local offices of the National Weather Service in the United States from April to May 2014.

United States yearly total

April

April 2 event

April 3 event

April 4 event

April 6 event

April 7 event

April 13 event

April 20 event

April 24 event

April 25 event

April 27 event (Central United States)

April 27 event (Washington)

April 28 event

April 29 event

April 30 event

May

May 6 event

May 7 event

May 8 event

May 10 event

May 11 event

May 12 event

May 14 event

May 15 event

May 16 event

May 18 event

May 20 event

May 21 event

May 22 event

May 23 event

May 24 event

May 25 event

May 26 event

May 27 event

May 28 event

May 30 event

May 31 event

See also
Tornadoes of 2014
Tornado outbreak of April 27–30, 2014

Notes

References

Tornadoes of 2014
2014, 04
April 2014 events in the United States
May 2014 events in the United States